The giant tree-rat (Toromys grandis) is a species in the family Echimyidae, the spiny rats. It is the only species in the monotypic genus Toromys. It is endemic to Brazil, where it occurs in the flooded forest along the banks of the Amazon River and its tributaries.

This species was formerly considered to be a member of the genera Loncheres and Makalata. In 2005 it was reclassified as the only member of the new genus Toromys.

The etymology of the genus name derives from the onomatopoeic Portuguese word , referring  to the vocalizations of this rodent, and the ancient greek word , meaning "mouse, rat".

Phylogeny
Toromys is the sister genus to Pattonomys. These taxa are closely related to Echimys, Phyllomys, and Makalata, reflecting the fact that Toromys grandis and Pattonomys occasius  have formerly been placed in Makalata by some authorities. In turn, these five genera share phylogenetic affinities with a clade containing the bamboo rats Dactylomys, Olallamys, Kannabateomys together with Diplomys and Santamartamys.

References

Echimyidae
Mammals described in 1845
Endemic fauna of Brazil
Taxa named by Johann Andreas Wagner